Oscar Ramón Nájera (born 12 December 1950) is a Honduran politician. He currently serves as deputy of the National Congress of Honduras representing the National Party of Honduras for Colón.

References

1950 births
Living people
People from Colón Department (Honduras)
Deputies of the National Congress of Honduras
National Party of Honduras politicians